Maksi  is a  city and a municipality in Shajapur district in the Indian state of Madhya Pradesh. It is famous for Jain Temple of Maksi Parshwanathh Ji. Maksi has an ever buzzing market which is famous for sweet samosas.

Geography
It has an average elevation of 480 metres (1574 feet).

Demographics
 India census, Maksi had a population of 98,392. Male constitute 52% of the population and females 48%. Maksi has an average literacy rate of 63%, higher than the national average of 59.5%: male literacy is 73%, and female literacy is 53%. In Maksi, 17% of the population is under six years of age. Maksi is famous for the holy Jain Temple Shri Makshi Parshvanath the 23 thirthankar of Jain religion.

Jain Pilgrimage
Shri Digamber and Shwetambar  Jain tirth (holy place) at Maksi is an ancient place of pilgrimage. There are two ancient temples here. First is the big temple called Bada Mandir is of Shwetambar sect, where the principal deity is Lord Parsvanath. This idol is supposed to be more than 2500 years old. According to archaeologists the temple itself is approximately 1000 years old. 42 idols installed by Jivaraj Papriwal in year 1491 (1548 V.S.) can also be found here. Second temple is of digambar sect shri suprshwanath bhagwan. In bada mandir or Shwetambar mandir the principle deity is also worshipped by digambar sect from 6:00 to 9:00 daily. After then, Shwetambar can worship by their own method. Temples such as Kesariyaji are also worshipped as per both Digambara tradition and Śvētāmbara tradition.

Maksi Prashvnath is considered to be a holy place for Jains. It's one amongst the 108 Parshvnaths of Jains. Behind the bada mandir, there is a beautiful garden where there are 4 shrines. This garden also has a big stepwell. People believe that idol of lord parshwanath was found from this stepwell.

Maksi is also famous for its singing group Maksi Mandal. It is owned by Mr. Shantilal Kothari, who is a famous singer of Malwa Region of Madhya Pradesh for old Jain Stavans. He started the group 30 years ago and dedicates all his Stavans to Lord Parsvanath.

Transportation
Maksi is located on Agra-Mumbai Road. It has direct train connections to Ujjain, Dewas, Bhopal, and Ruthiyai.

References

Cities and towns in Shajapur district
Shajapur
11th-century Jain temples